The Van Laar equation is a thermodynamic activity model, which was developed by Johannes van Laar in 1910-1913, to describe phase equilibria of liquid mixtures. The equation was derived from the Van der Waals equation. The original van der Waals parameters didn't give good description of vapor-liquid equilibria of phases, which forced the user to fit the parameters to experimental results. Because of this, the model lost the connection to  molecular properties, and therefore it has to be regarded as an empirical model to correlate experimental results.

Equations
Van Laar  derived the excess enthalpy from the van der Waals equation:

In here  ai and bi are the van der Waals parameters for attraction and excluded volume of component i. He used the conventional quadratic mixing rule for the energy parameter a and the linear mixing rule for the size parameter b. 
Since these parameters didn't lead to good phase equilibrium description the model was reduced to the form:

In here A12 and A21 are the van Laar coefficients, which are obtained by regression of experimental vapor–liquid equilibrium data.

The activity coefficient of component i is derived by differentiation to  xi. This yields:

This shows that the van Laar coefficients A12 and A21 are equal to logarithmic limiting activity coefficients   and  respectively. The model gives increasing (A12 and A21 >0) or only decreasing  (A12 and A21 <0) activity coefficients with decreasing concentration. The model can not describe extrema in the activity coefficient along the concentration range.

In case , which implies that the molecules are of equal size but different in polarity, then the equations become:

In this case the activity coefficients mirror at x1=0.5. When A=0, the activity coefficients are unity, thus describing an ideal mixture.

Recommended values 
An extensive range of recommended values for the Van Laar coefficients can be found in the literature. Selected values are provided in the table below.

References

Thermodynamic equations